Clarins is a family-run French multinational cosmetics company, which was founded in Paris in 1954 by Jacques Courtin-Clarins. In addition to manufacturing and selling cosmetics, skincare and perfume products, the company is also a major player in the spa and well-being sector.

Clarins operates in over 150 countries and is available at high-end department stores and selected retailers with the Clarins and My Blend brands, and is a major luxury skincare brand in Europe. Although more than 95% of its products are exported worldwide, they are formulated and designed in Clarins Laboratories in France.

History 

Significant milestones in the history of Clarins:

 1954: Jacques Courtin-Clarins opens his first Beauty Institute on Rue Tronchet in Paris.

 1968: Clarins creates its Client Card, which is included in the packaging of Clarins skincare products. 
 1974: Christian Courtin-Clarins joins the company as Director of Exports.

 1984: Clarins is listed on the secondary market of the Paris stock exchange, which is a real development opportunity for the company.

 1991: Clarins launches its first makeup collection as well as a line of products with an anti-pollution complex.
 1994: Olivier Courtin-Clarins joins Clarins as a board member after a successful medical career.

 2002: Clarins launches the ClarinsMen range for men.

 2008: Clarins is delisted from the Paris stock exchange.

 2010: Virginie, Claire, Prisca and Jenna Courtin-Clarins become members of the Supervisory Board.

 2011: After having held the position of Chairman of the Board since 2000, Christian Courtin-Clarins is named President of the Supervisory Board.
 2015: After more than 25 years of experience working for Clarins, Jonathan Zrihen is appointed President & CEO.

 2017: After her role as Head of Development and New Concepts, Jenna Courtin-Clarins becomes an ambassador for the brand.

 2018: After her time as Managing Director at Mugler Mode, Virginie Courtin-Clarins is appointed Deputy CEO.

 2018: After working as Clarins' Director of Spas, Retail & My Blend, Prisca Courtin-Clarins becomes a member of the Supervisory Board as a representative of Famille C, the holding company of the Courtin-Clarins family.

 2018: Clarins researches and produces its first ingredients at Domaine Clarins, an outdoor laboratory in the heart of a protected area in the Alps.

 2019: Clarins expands its reach to new areas with My Clarins, a cosmetics range for 18 to 29-year-old women.

 2020: Clarins hands over Mugler & Azzaro to L'Oréal to refocus on beauty, its core business, with Clarins and My Blend.

 2020: Clarins opens its R&D center in Shanghai, China.

 2022: Clarins launched a traceability platform for its products called the Clarins T.R.U.S.T. that utilizes blockchain technology.

Board of directors
Clarins is headed by Jonathan Zrihen, President & CEO, Olivier Courtin-Clarins, Managing Director, and Virginie Courtin-Clarins, Deputy Executive Director. Christian Courtin-Clarins is the President of the Supervisory Board.

The Courtin Arthritis Foundation
Founded by Jaques Courtin Clarins in 1989, this association made it possible to further the research efforts for polyarthritis and chronic inflammatory rheumatism. Also, the foundation is responsible for many of the major advances in rheumatoid arthritis research.

References

External links
 
 Clarins Group official website
 "Christian Courtin-Clarins". Time. November 29, 2005.

Cosmetics companies of France
Perfume houses
French brands
Cosmetics brands
Design companies established in 1954
Manufacturing companies established in 1954
Companies based in Île-de-France